University College Boat Club may refer to:

 University College Boat Club (Durham)
 University College Boat Club (Oxford)